Agia Varvara ("Saint Barbara") is a small islet off the northern coast of the Greek island of Crete in the Aegean Sea. It is a short distance from the islet of Afentis Christos at Malia. The islet is administered from Malia in Heraklion regional unit.

See also
List of islands of Greece

Landforms of Heraklion (regional unit)
Uninhabited islands of Crete
Islands of Greece